Unzaga is a surname of Basque origins that may refer to
Luis de Unzaga (1721–1790), Spanish Governor of Louisiana
Jon Unzaga (born 1962), Spanish cyclist 
Óscar Únzaga (1916–1959), Bolivian political figure and rebel 
Ramón Unzaga (1894–1923), Spanish-Chilean football player

Basque-language surnames